PT Matahari Department Store Tbk, commonly known as Matahari, is the largest retail platform in Indonesia with stores located across the country and online presence on Matahari.com. For over 60 years, Matahari has provided the growing Indonesian middle class with quality, fashionable and affordable apparel, beauty and footwear products.

History 
The company was established on October 24, 1958, with the opening of a children's fashion store in Jakarta's Pasar Baru district; the first proper Matahari outlet was opened in 1972, considered as the first modern department store in the country. It currently operates 150 stores in 80 cities across Indonesia.

In this digital era, Matahari capitalize digital technology through the omni-channel retail experience. Acknowledging the importance of physical shopping experience and online presence, the pandemic has accelerated and highlighted an increasing demand for the omni-channel retail experience to serve consumers. In order to deliver a seamless omni-channel shopping experience, Matahari has opened its online channel, namely Matahari.com, Social Commerce Shop & Talk, as well as official store in marketplace, such as Shopee and Tokopedia. Matahari also deliver the message to society through social media such as Matahari YouTube channel and Instagram @matahari and @storyofmatahari.

Matahari had a strong Q1 2022 performance in spite the Omicron variant peaking in February. Also, retail operating hours normalizing and restrictions being largely removed aids trading conditions going forward. Matahari's new merchandise and merchandising practices helped both sales and margin productivity, and a strong recovery momentum boosts our ability to invest in stores, technology, and marketing to create a virtuous cycle. The Company continued to focus on operational excellence, strategy execution, and cost rigor to drive superior results.

Matahari also posted a full-year performance that exceeded expectations throughout 2021, in line with the improving traffic to shopping centers, compared to 2020. Matahari recorded a net profit of Rp913 billion in 2021 compared to a loss of Rp873 billion in 2020. This was supported by the trading performance in the fourth quarter of 2021, the easing of restrictions, and initiatives taken by the company. Amid the pandemic, the Company booked a positive performance during the first nine months of 2021. Matahari posted growth both in terms of top line and bottom line. Matahari noted that the emergency PPKM which began in early July 2021 made the Company temporarily closing several outlets for two months, with another 31 outlets remaining open with various restrictions. In early September 2021, Matahari re-opened 100% of its stores and continues to gain a positive recovery week by week. This continued in October 2021 with the recovery reaching over 70% compared to 2019.

Matahari's digital initiatives were to withstand deeper pressures in 2020. Matahari reduces all operating expenses through negotiations with shopping center owners for reduced rental costs. With heavy liquidity pressure, LPPF also received additional banking facilities worth Rp500 billion in 2020. For information, Matahari has fully repaid the loan in 2021. Matahari continues to enforce cost controls to keep cash flow liquid. The company remains conservative in its capital expenditures. All employees who initially received salary delays received full salaries in the fourth quarter of 2020, albeit with a lower number of employees. At the time, Matahari was confident to be the first retailer in Indonesia to recover salary payments by the end of 2020.

Project Sunrise 
In 2022, during Q4 2021 Earnings presentation, Matahari announced its plans to create four store concepts to capture the middle-up class that is currently dominated by Sogo Department Store in Indonesia. Dubbed Project Sunrise, the project was made as part of its recovery from COVID-19 impact. The four concepts are following:

Flagship

 Dubbed as the crown jewel of the brand. Targeted for middle-up class.
 Size: more than 8000 sqm (average 10.000+ sqm)
 Location: key locations in Tier 1 areas such as Jabodetabek, Surabaya, Medan, Yogyakarta
 Layout: in-store theatre concept, signature services (beauty bar, cafe, etc.)
 Assortment: newest and broadest stock of Matahari's product range
 Example outlets: Plaza Ambarrukmo, Mal Taman Anggrek, Tunjungan Plaza

Core

 Targeted to the higher end of middle class
 Size: average 6000-8000 sqm
 Location: Tier 1 and 2 areas (Jabodetabek, Surabaya, Medan, Yogyakarta, Padang, Jambi, Lampung, Banyuwangi, Banyumas, Semarang, Pontianak, Banjarmasin, Palangkaraya, Tarakan, Makassar)
 Layout: select signature services (depending on outlet) and higher quality visual merchandising
 Assortment: fresh competitive product range
 Example outlets: Supermal Karawaci, Lippo Mall Puri, Pakuwon Mall Surabaya
Mainstream
 Emerging catchment to strengthen market leader position with middle class positioning
 Size: average 5000-7000 sqm
 Location: Tier 2 and 3 areas
 Layout: mainstream
 Assortment: depending on region
 Example outlets: Citimall Cianjur, One Batam Mall

Pareto Compact

 Size: ~3000 sqm
 Location: upper-mid lifestyle/family malls with limited space and in metro areas (Tier 1 areas such as Jabodetabek, Surabaya, Medan)
 Layout: redesigned trading areas and optimal non-trading space
 Assortment: only top-performing brands and SKUs with heroes (such as Disney products) and traffic drivers (not just apparel)
 Example outlets: Not yet piloted

The Pareto Compact store concept is currently underway yet to be unveiled, while Matahari's flagship concept stores at Plaza Ambarrukmo and Mal Taman Anggrek, followed by the reorganization of Supermal Karawaci store as the Core store, will be unveiled in 2022.

Rebranding Matahari 
On October 8, 2022, Matahari launched a new identity and brand new imagery moving in the direction of a large format specialist or as the company refers to a ‘House of Specialists’ where it represents a rejuvenated merchandise offer, fresh new store concepts, upgraded customer experience. Matahari hosted a rebranding launch event at Atrium Mall Taman Anggrek to serve the specialist fashion needs of the biggest cohorts of customers across Indonesia in line with its 5 years strategy of building market share in its target market as the most pervasive retail brand in its sector.

To realize the concept of 'House of Specialists', Matahari focuses on four main things: Products, Price, Customer Experience and People.

Matahari provides a diverse selection of fashion products and constantly adds new brands in all categories. The collections are aspirational because the products are carefully curated based on customer personas, trends, and fresher designs, ensuring a stylish look for daily wear. 
The collections at Matahari build senses of ‘feel good‘and confidence.

Matahari has a range of international quality products at affordable prices. To get an optimal shopping experience, customers can take advantage of the free Matahari Rewards membership and get flexible and direct shopping discounts.

Now shopping experience at Matahari is fun & engaging with multi - skilled staff equipped with new modern uniforms. The outlets are illuminated by environmentally friendly LED lights with shopping alleys that are neatly arranged and spacious. Matahari optimizes the layout of its products into specialist areas such as men's wear, beauty, ladies' wear, baby shop, children's wear, footwear, and casual sport. A carefully reorganized shopping area makes it easy for customers to search for the items they need. Matahari also provides a Click-and-Collect service or Shop and Talk where customers can shop via their personal shopping assistant to help find the things they need and collect their shopping at the nearest store once fully rolled out across 2022 and 2023.

Besides holding programs that develop the self-capacity of employees and business partners, Matahari increases its concern in building the education of future generations through 10 library schools’ renovation in 10 areas in Indonesia. Matahari impacts more than 1,000,000 lives through local jobs creation and community support.

References

External links 
 

Department stores of Indonesia
Retail companies established in 1958
Indonesian brands
Companies based in Tangerang
Companies listed on the Indonesia Stock Exchange
1958 establishments in Indonesia
2009 initial public offerings